Jesús, nuestro Señor is a 1971 Mexican religious epic film starring Claudio Brook in the title role as Jesus. It was directed by Miguel Zacarías and produced and written by Alfredo Zacarías. The film features an ensemble cast that includes Narciso Busquets, Elsa Cárdenas, Pancho Córdova, and Carlos Agostí.

Shot in 1969, the film was released on Holy Thursday, April 8, 1971. It was filmed in full color and is the last installment of a trilogy that includes Jesús, el niño Dios and Jesús, María y José.

Trivia
 In a scene in which Jesus enters Jerusalem, the houses at Guanajuato were almost seen
 In another scene, the crowd gathered for the Sermon on the Mount scene amidst the volcano Popocatepetl as the backdrop
 In this film most of the scenes were filmed in 1969, and couple of them were filmed in 1970.
 The 1st Movie of Claudio Brook filmed coming back to his home country from Europe.

Differences Between the Film and the Gospel
 The presence of John the Apostle is only appeared on the Gospels when Jesus called the first four apostles. In the film, in the Baptism scene, John was looking for the Messiah by approaching another John, the Baptist.
 The Crucifixion scene is followed directly by the appearance of Christ to the Apostles and the Ascension scene. In the Gospels, the death of Jesus is followed by the burial and resurrection before going to the Ascension.
 The Pater Noster is supposed to be used during the Sermon at the Mount scenes in most film adaptations of Jesus. This prayer is said by apostles followed by an act of Benediction by Jesus to them before going up to Heaven.

See also
Claudio Brook
Mexican films of 1969

References

Mexican biographical drama films
Films about Christianity
Portrayals of the Virgin Mary in film
Films about Jesus
Religious epic films
Films directed by Miguel Zacarías
1970 films
1970s Spanish-language films
1970s Mexican films